Tsq'altubo, located in the north of Imereti region of Western Georgia, is a resort situated about 30 km northwest to the city of Kutaisi.

Geography of Georgia (country)

et:Tskaltubo
ka:წყალტუბო
fi:Tsqaltubo